Mohamed Mahmoud (born 10 June 1971) is an Egyptian boxer. He competed in the men's light heavyweight event at the 1996 Summer Olympics.

References

1971 births
Living people
Egyptian male boxers
Olympic boxers of Egypt
Boxers at the 1996 Summer Olympics
Place of birth missing (living people)
Light-heavyweight boxers
20th-century Egyptian people